A bearded axe, or Skeggøx (from Old Norse Skegg, "beard", and øx, "axe"), is any of various axes, used as a tool and weapon, as early as the 6th century AD. It is most commonly associated with Viking Age Scandinavians. The hook or "beard", i.e. the lower portion of the axe bit extending the cutting edge below the width of the butt, provides a wide cutting surface while keeping the overall mass of the axe low.  This design allows the user to grip the haft directly behind the head for planing or shaving wood and variations of this design are still in use by modern woodworkers and some foresters. The "beard" of the axe would also have been useful in battle, for example to pull a weapon or shield out of a defender's grasp.

There are a number of variants in its design.

See also                                                              

Viking Age arms and armor
Viking axe

References

Axes
Medieval blade weapons
Viking warfare
Germanic weapons